George Madison Adams (December 20, 1837 – April 6, 1920) was a U.S. Representative from Kentucky, nephew of Green Adams, and slaveowner.

Early years 
Adams was born in Barbourville, Knox County, Kentucky, on December 20, 1837. He received private instruction from his father and studied law at Centre College in Danville, Kentucky, but did not graduate. He served as clerk of the circuit court of Knox County, from 1859 to 1861.

During the Civil War, he enlisted in the Union army, raised a company of volunteers and was captain of Company H, 7th Regiment Kentucky Volunteer Infantry, from 1861 to 1863. In 1863 he was appointed additional paymaster of volunteers with the rank of captain, serving until 1865.

He was a slaveowner, as was his son.

Career 
Adams was elected as a Democrat to the Fortieth and to the three succeeding Congresses from March 4, 1867, to March 3, 1875 (41st, 42rd and 43rd congresses). He was an unsuccessful candidate for reelection in 1874 to the Forty-fourth Congress.

Adams was elected Clerk of the House of Representatives on December 6, 1875, during the Forty-fourth Congress, and served until the commencement of the Forty-seventh Congress, December 5, 1881.

He was appointed register of the Kentucky land office by Governor J. Proctor Knott and served from 1884 to 1887. He was appointed secretary of state for Kentucky by Governor Simon B. Buckner and served from 1887 to 1891. He was appointed Kentucky State railroad commissioner in 1891. He was appointed United States pension agent at Louisville by President Grover Cleveland and served from 1894 to 1898.

Last years
After retirement he resided at Winchester, Clark County, Kentucky, until his death April 6, 1920. He was interred at Lexington Cemetery at Lexington, Kentucky.

References

Sources

External links

1837 births
1920 deaths
People from Barbourville, Kentucky
American people of English descent
Democratic Party members of the United States House of Representatives from Kentucky
Clerks of the United States House of Representatives
Secretaries of State of Kentucky
Kentucky lawyers
American slave owners
People from Winchester, Kentucky
19th-century American lawyers
Centre College alumni
Union Army officers
Southern Unionists in the American Civil War
People of Kentucky in the American Civil War